The Berau people, also known as Berau Malays or Berau Benua is a sub-ethnic group of Malays that lives in Berau, in the north of East Kalimantan province, Indonesia. The Berau culture began with the former Berau Sultanate, an Islamic kingdom established in Kalimantan in the 14th century to the early 1700s. They speak Berau language or Berau Malay, which is a variant of Malay.

Folk songs
 Kabbar Di Rantau
 Mun Rangat Akhirnya

References

berau Regency
Malay people
Indonesian people of Malay descent
Ethnic groups in Indonesia